Dilworth House is a historic home located at Port Penn, New Castle County, Delaware.  The earliest section of the house dates to the late-17th century.  It was built in two sections; the west section being the oldest.  It consists of two separate, -story brick sections, each three bays wide.  The house features diapered brickwork.  A frame rear wing was added in the second half of the 19th century.  The Dilworth House is a rare surviving specimen of an early Delaware yeoman's house.

It was listed on the National Register of Historic Places in 1973.

References

Houses on the National Register of Historic Places in Delaware
Houses in New Castle County, Delaware
National Register of Historic Places in New Castle County, Delaware